Mar Tony Neelankavil is a Syro-Malabar catholic bishop and titular bishop of Masuccaba. He is the third and the present Auxiliary Bishop of Syro-Malabar Catholic Archdiocese of Thrissur from November 2017. He was nominated as the Auxiliary Bishop on 1 September 2017 and was ordained to the office on 18 November 2017 by Archbishop Mar Andrews Thazhath assisted by Mar Jacob Thoomkuzhy and Mar Raphael Thattil.

Early life
Neelankavil was born on 23 July 1967, at Valapad, as the eldest son among the five children of Chevalier Prof. N.A Ouseph and T.J Mary in the Archeparchy of Trichur. He belongs to Our Lady of Lourdes Metropolitan Cathedral Trichur. Neelankavil had his school education at St. Raphael's Lower Primary School, Ollur and Latin Convent L.P. School, Trichur, Don Bosco School, Mannuthy and Model High School for Boys, Trichur. After having completed his Pre-Degree Course at St. Thomas College, Thrissur, he joined St. Mary's Minor Seminary, Trichur in 1984.

Career
Neelankavil had his Philosophy and Theology course at St. Thomas Apostolic Seminary, Vadavathoor (1986-1993). He was ordained priest on 27 December 1993. He served as assistant parish priest at St. Antony's Forane Church Ollur (1994–95) and St. Thomas Syro-Malabar Church, Palayoor (1995). Then he was sent for higher studies in Leuven, Belgium, Catholic University, KU Leuven where he took licentiate in 1997 and Doctorate in Theology in 2002. He joined as professor at Marymatha Major Seminary in 2002 and served the Seminary as Animator, Dean of Studies, Lecturer of Systematic Theology, Spiritual Father, Director of Marymatha Publications and Rector of the Marymatha Major Seminary. He served the Archeparchy of Trichur as a member of the Theological Commission, chaplain of different formation centers and convents, and a member of Presbyteral Council.  He also served as chaplain of Jesus Fraternity (Prison ministry) at Special Sub-Jail, Trichur.

Theologian and Bishop
He has founded Pastoral Animation Research for Outreach and Community-building - PAROC Research Institute, a new venture to re-visualize the pastoral ministry in the present context and to train pastoral leaders from the clergy, the religious and the laity. Neelankavil is a well-known orator, writer and theologian. He has presented papers in several theological conferences, both national and international. He has published several scientific articles in national and international journals and has edited three scholarly books. He has received Junior Scholar Fellowship from the Catholic University KU Leuven, Belgium twice and has received the famous Gambrinus Fellowship from the Technische Universiteit, Dortmund, Germany. 
He was also member of the Theology Forum of the Syro-Malabar Church and of the Liturgical Research Centre. He was also a member of CBCI Bishops-Theologians Colloquium. Presently, he is the Chairman of the Doctrinal Commission of the Kerala Catholic Bishops' Conference, Chairman of the Doctrinal Commission of the Syro-Malabar Church, Chairman of the Liturgical Research Centre, the Episcopal member of the Synodal Commission for St. Joseph's Pontifical Seminary, Aluva and the Episcopal member of the Health Commission of the KCBC. He is proficient in Malayalam, English, and German.
He has participated in the Third International Conference on Catechesis from 8 to 10 September 2022, organized by the Pontifical Council for Promoting New Evangelization in Paul VI Hall, Vatican.

References

Further reading

1967 births
Living people
Christian clergy from Thrissur
Syro-Malabar Catholics
Syro-Malabar bishops
21st-century Eastern Catholic bishops
People from Kerala